The 1993–94 NBA season was the Spurs' 18th season in the National Basketball Association, and 27th season as a franchise. It was also their first season playing at the Alamodome. During the off-season, the Spurs acquired controversial All-Star forward and rebound specialist Dennis Rodman from the Detroit Pistons, signed free agent Sleepy Floyd, and acquired Negele Knight from the Phoenix Suns during the first month of the regular season. The Spurs went on an 8-game winning streak between November and December after a 4–5 start to the season. The team would then win 13 consecutive games between January and February, holding a 35–14 record at the All-Star break, but then lose seven of their final ten games, finishing second in the Midwest Division with a 55–27 record.

David Robinson captured the scoring title leading the league with 29.8 points, and contributed 10.7 rebounds, 4.8 assists, 1.7 steals and 3.3 blocks per game, and was named to the All-NBA Second Team, NBA All-Defensive First Team, and was selected for the 1994 NBA All-Star Game. He also finished in second place in both Most Valuable Player, and Defensive Player of the Year voting. In addition, Rodman led the league with 17.3 rebounds per game, and was named to the NBA All-Defensive Second Team, while Dale Ellis finished second on the team in scoring with 15.2 points per game, Willie Anderson provided with 11.9 points and 4.3 assists per game, and Vinny Del Negro contributed 10.0 points and 4.2 assists per game. Off the bench, Knight averaged 9.3 points and 3.1 assists per game, and J.R. Reid contributed 9.0 points per game.

In the Western Conference First Round of the playoffs, the Spurs faced off against the 5th-seeded Utah Jazz. Despite winning Game 1 at home, 106–89, Rodman became a distraction as he scuffled with head coach John Lucas, as the Spurs lost to the Jazz in four games. Rodman had committed a flagrant foul on Jazz guard John Stockton in Game 2, and was suspended for Game 3. Following the season, Lucas departed for a job as head coach and General Manager for the Philadelphia 76ers, while Ellis signed as a free agent with the Denver Nuggets, Floyd re-signed with the New Jersey Nets, and Antoine Carr signed with the Utah Jazz.

One notable highlight of the season was Robinson recording a quadruple-double of 34 points, 10 rebounds, 10 assists and 10 blocks in a 115–96 home win over the Detroit Pistons on February 17, 1994. Another notable highlight was Robinson scoring a career-high of 71 points on the final day of the regular season, in a 112–97 road win over the Los Angeles Clippers on April 24, 1994. In March, Ellis became the first player in NBA history to reach 1,000 career three-point field-goals, as he hit his 1,000 three-pointer in a 107–100 home win over the Sacramento Kings on March 19, 1994.

Draft picks

Roster

Regular season

Season standings

z – clinched division title
y – clinched division title
x – clinched playoff spot

Record vs. opponents

Game log

Playoffs

|- align="center" bgcolor="#ccffcc"
| 1
| April 28
| Utah
| W 106–89
| David Robinson (25)
| Dennis Rodman (11)
| David Robinson (7)
| Alamodome18,257
| 1–0
|- align="center" bgcolor="#ffcccc"
| 2
| April 30
| Utah
| L 84–96
| Negele Knight (16)
| Dennis Rodman (17)
| Vinny Del Negro (5)
| Alamodome
| 1–1
|- align="center" bgcolor="#ffcccc"
| 3
| May 3
| @ Utah
| L 72–105
| Robinson, Carr (16)
| Robinson, Cummings (11)
| Del Negro, Knight (4)
| Delta Center19,911
| 1–2
|- align="center" bgcolor="#ffcccc"
| 4
| May 5
| @ Utah
| L 90–95
| David Robinson (27)
| Dennis Rodman (20)
| Willie Anderson (7)
| Delta Center19,911
| 1–3
|-

Player statistics

Season

Playoffs

Awards and records
David Robinson, NBA All-Star
David Robinson, All-NBA Second Team
David Robinson, NBA All-Defensive Second Team
Dennis Rodman, NBA All-Defensive Second Team

Transactions

References

See also
1993–94 NBA season

San Antonio Spurs seasons
San Antonio
San Antonio
San Antonio